Cladistia is a clade of bony fishes whose only living members are the bichirs. Their major synapomorphies are a heterocercal tail in which the dorsal fin has independent rays, and a posteriorly elongated parasphenoid.

Cladistia are the earliest diverging branch of living Actinopterygii, sister group of Actinopteri, the group which includes all other living ray finned fish.

Aside from bichirs, other extinct fish groups thought to be members of the group include the Scanilepiformes, known from the Triassic period.

Taxonomy

Based on work done by Lund 2000 

 Order †Guildayichthyiformes Lund 2000
 Family †Guildayichthyidae Lund 2000
 Genus †Guildayichthys Lund 2000
 Species †Guildayichthys carnegiei Lund 2000
 Genus †Discoserra Lund 2000
 Species †Discoserra pectinodon Lund 2000
 Order Polypteriformes Bleeker 1859
 Genus †Latinopollia Meunier and Gayet 1998
 Species †Latinopollia suarezi (Meunier & Gayet 1996) Meunier & Gayet 1998
 Genus †Dagetella Gayet & Meunier 1991
 Species †Dagetella sudamericana Gayet & Meunier 1991
 Genus †Bartschichthys Gayet & Meunier 1996 [Bartschia Gayet & Meunier 1996 non Rehder 1943]
 Species †B. arnoulti (Gayet & Meunier 1996) [Bartschia arnoulti Gayet & Meunier 1996]
 Species †B. napatensis Werner & Gayet 1997
 Species †B. tubularis (Gayet & Meunier 1996) [Bartschia tubularis Gayet & Meunier 1996]
 Genus †Sudania Werner & Gayet 1997
 Species †S. gracilis Werner & Gayet 1997
 Species †S. oblonga Werner & Gayet 1997
 Genus †Saharichthys Werner & Gayet 1997
 Species †S. nigeriensis (Gayet & Meunier 1996) [Sainthilairia nigeriensis Gayet & Meunier 1996]
 Species †S. africanus (Gayet & Meunier 1996) [Sainthilairia africana Gayet & Meunier 1996]
 Genus †Sainthilairia Gayet & Meunier 1996
 Species †S. beccussiformis Gayet & Meunier 1996
 Species †S. elongata Werner & Gayet 1997
 Species †S. falciformis Gayet & Meunier 1996
 Species †S. grandis Gayet & Meunier 1996
 Species †S. intermedia Werner & Gayet 1997
 Genus †Inbecetemia Werner & Gayet 1997
 Species †I. torta (Gayet & Meunier 1996) [Sainthilairia torta Gayet & Meunier 1996]
 Species †I. tortissima (Gayet & Meunier 1996) [Sainthilairia tortissima Gayet & Meunier 1996]
 Genus †Nagaia Werner & Gayet 1997
 Species †Nagaia extrema Werner & Gayet 1997
 Family Polypteridae Lacépède 1803 sensu stricto
 Genus †Bawitius Grandstaff et al. 2012
 Species †Bawitius bartheli (Schaal 1984) Grandstaff et al. 2012 [Polypterus bartheli Schaal 1984]
 Genus †Serenoichthys Dutheil 1999
 Species †Serenoichthys kemkemensis Dutheil 1999
 Genus Erpetoichthys Smith 1865 [Calamoichthys Smith 1866]
 Species Erpetoichthys calabaricus
 Genus Polypterus Lacepède 1803
 Species Polypterus ansorgii Boulenger, 1910
 Species Polypterus bichir Lacépède, 1803
 Species Polypterus congicus Boulenger, 1898
 Species Polypterus delhezi Boulenger, 1899 
 Species Polypterus endlicheri Heckel, 1847
 Species Polypterus mokelembembe Schliewen & Schäfer, 2006
 Species Polypterus ornatipinnis Boulenger, 1902
 Species Polypterus palmas Ayres, 1850
 Species Polypterus polli J. P. Gosse, 1988 
 Species Polypterus retropinnis Vaillant, 1899
 Species Polypterus senegalus Cuvier, 1829
 Species Polypterus teugelsi Britz, 2004
 Species Polypterus weeksii Boulenger, 1898

References

 
Ray-finned fish taxonomy
Vertebrate subclasses